Arch Falls is an outdoor 1981 bronze sculpture by American artist Bryan Hunt, installed at the Museum of Fine Arts, Houston's Lillie and Hugh Roy Cullen Sculpture Garden, in the U.S. state of Texas. The sculpture rests on a limestone base. It was gifted by the Charles Engelhard Foundation.

See also

 1981 in art
 List of public art in Houston

References

1981 establishments in Texas
1981 sculptures
Bronze sculptures in Texas
Lillie and Hugh Roy Cullen Sculpture Garden
Sculptures by American artists